Beta-crystallin A3 is a protein that in humans is encoded by the CRYBA1 gene.

Crystallins are separated into two classes: taxon-specific, or enzyme, and ubiquitous. The latter class constitutes the major proteins of vertebrate eye lens and maintains the transparency and refractive index of the lens. Since lens central fiber cells lose their nuclei during development, these crystallins are made and then retained throughout life, making them extremely stable proteins. Mammalian lens crystallins are divided into alpha, beta, and gamma families; beta and gamma crystallins are also considered as a superfamily. Alpha and beta families are further divided into acidic and basic groups. Seven protein regions exist in crystallins: four homologous motifs, a connecting peptide, and N- and C-terminal extensions. Beta-crystallins, the most heterogeneous, differ by the presence of the C-terminal extension (present in the basic group, none in the acidic group). Beta-crystallins form aggregates of different sizes and are able to self-associate to form dimers or to form heterodimers with other beta-crystallins. This gene, a beta acidic group member, encodes two proteins (crystallin, beta A3 and crystallin, beta A1) from a single mRNA, the latter protein is 17 aa shorter than crystallin, beta A3 and is generated by use of an alternate translation initiation site. Deletion of exons 3 and 4 causes the autosomal dominant disease 'zonular cataract with sutural opacities'.

References

Further reading